Rajeev Ram was the defending champion, but lost in the second round to Dudi Sela.

Ivo Karlović won the title, defeating Gilles Müller in the final, 6–7(2–7), 7–6(7–5), 7–6(14–12).

Seeds
The top four seeds receive a bye into the second round.

Draw

Finals

Top half

Bottom half

Qualifying

Seeds

Qualifiers

Lucky loser
  Amir Weintraub

Qualifying draw

First qualifier

Second qualifier

Third qualifier

Fourth qualifier

References

 Main Draw
 Qualifying Draw

Hall of Fame Tennis Championships - Singles